Neil Roberts (born 1946, Manchester) is an Emeritus Professor of English literature at the University of Sheffield. He is the author of critical studies of Ted Hughes, D. H. Lawrence, George Eliot and George Meredith, including the first critical study of Peter Redgrove.

Roberts's book A Lucid Dreamer was shortlisted for the 2013 East Midlands Book Award.

Life
Neil Roberts was born in Manchester in 1946 and educated in Latymer Upper School, London, and Clare College, Cambridge.

Selected publications

References 

1946 births
Alumni of Clare College, Cambridge
Academics of the University of Sheffield
British academics of English literature
Living people